Constempellina is a genus of non-biting midges in the subfamily Chironominae of the bloodworm family Chironomidae.

Species

C. bita Pankratova, 1983
C. brevicosta (Edwards, 1937)

References 

Chironomidae
Nematocera genera